Ashburton was a New Zealand electorate, first created in 1881 and centred on the South Island town of Ashburton.

Population centres
The previous electoral redistribution was undertaken in 1875 for the 1875–1876 election. In the six years since, New Zealand's European population had increased by 65%. In the 1881 electoral redistribution, the House of Representatives increased the number of European representatives to 91 (up from 84 since the 1875–76 election). The number of Māori electorates was held at four. The House further decided that electorates should not have more than one representative, which led to 35 new electorates being formed, including Ashburton, and two electorates that had previously been abolished to be recreated. This necessitated a major disruption to existing boundaries.

The town of Ashburton itself was on the very edge of the electorate, which stretched northwest up the Ashburton River / Hakatere. It included Methven, Mount Somers, and Lake Heron. However, the boundaries of Ashburton electorate were highly variable, with the town of Ashburton being the only constant. In the 1887 election, the most of the electorate's southern half was taken away to join the new Rangitata seat, but in the 1890 election, most of this territory was regained, with a similar amount of territory in the north, around Methven, being taken instead. Methven was incorporated into the Ellesmere seat. Ashburton also gained territory on the coast at this point. In the 1893 election, the situation reverted to its previous state, with the south being lost and Methven regained, but this itself was reversed in the 1896 election. The electorate then remained relatively stable until the 1911 election, when completely new boundaries were established — the electorate was now centred on Geraldine, with Ashburton itself in a spur at the northeastern extremity. The 1919 election saw a complete revocation of this, with the electorate going back to focus on its original southern territories, and gaining Lake Coleridge. It lost Lake Coleridge again in the 1922 election. In the 1928 election, the seat was abolished, with its northern half merging with Ellesmere to form Mid-Canterbury and its southern half being absorbed into Temuka.

The 1941 New Zealand census had been postponed due to World War II, so the 1946 electoral redistribution had to take ten years of population growth and movements into account. The North Island gained a further two electorates from the South Island due to faster population growth. The abolition of the country quota through the Electoral Amendment Act, 1945 reduced the number and increased the size of rural electorates. None of the existing electorates remained unchanged, 27 electorates were abolished, 19 electorates were created for the first time, and eight former electorates were re-established, including Ashburton. The recreated Ashburton electorate took territory from both Mid-Canterbury and Temuka. In the 1957 election, it gained Geraldine from Waimate, but lost Methven to Selwyn. In the 1963 election, it gained a large amount of inland territory, including Lake Tekapo and Twizel. In 1969 election, the electorate was abolished — most of its territory was merged with Waitaki to form South Canterbury, while Ashburton itself was incorporated into Selwyn.

Through an amendment in the Electoral Act in 1965, the number of electorates in the South Island was fixed at 25, an increase of one since the 1962 electoral redistribution. It was accepted that through the more rapid population growth in the North Island, the number of its electorates would continue to increase, and to keep proportionality, three new electorates were allowed for in the 1967 electoral redistribution for the next election. In the North Island, five electorates were newly created and one electorate was reconstituted while three electorates were abolished. In the South Island, three electorates were newly created and one electorate was reconstituted while three electorates were abolished (including Ashburton). The overall effect of the required changes was highly disruptive to existing electorates, with all but three electorates having their boundaries altered.

A third electorate named Ashburton was created for the 1978 election. It was formed from the southern portion of Rakaia (the successor to Selwyn) and the northern portion of South Canterbury, and included Methven, Geraldine, and Fairlie. In the 1984 election, Fairlie was absorbed into Timaru, and in the 1987 election, the electorate absorbed the town of Rakaia. In the 1990 election, the seat was abolished again, with the seat of Rakaia being established to replace it.

History
Although the electorate has always included the town of Ashburton, and often a number of smaller towns, the bulk of its territory has always been rural. As such, the electorate has tended to be rather conservative in its political outlook. The Liberal Party held the seat for a time during its period of dominance, but the seat later became the stronghold of William Nosworthy, a senior figure in the conservative Reform Party.

Edward George Wright was the first representative of Ashburton; he had since  represented the  electorate.

By the time of the second Ashburton electorate, rural New Zealand was largely united behind the National Party, which held Ashburton for the whole of its second and third incarnations. Its last MP was Jenny Shipley, who went on to become Prime Minister.

Members of Parliament
Key

Election results

1925 election

1922 election

1919 election

1914 election

1911 election

1908 election

1905 election

1902 election

1899 election

1896 election

1893 election

1890 election

1887 election

1884 election

Notes

References

Historical electorates of New Zealand
Ashburton, New Zealand
1881 establishments in New Zealand
1946 establishments in New Zealand
1978 establishments in New Zealand
1928 disestablishments in New Zealand
1969 disestablishments in New Zealand
1993 disestablishments in New Zealand
Politics of Canterbury, New Zealand